Harib Al Qaramish District is a district of the Ma'rib Governorate, Yemen. As of 2003, the district had a population of 8,573 inhabitants.

References

Districts of Marib Governorate